The knockout stage of the 1999 FIFA Confederations Cup began on 1 August with the semi-final round, and concluded on 4 August 1999 with the final at the Estadio Azteca in Mexico City. The top two teams from each group advanced to the knockout stage to compete in a single-elimination style tournament. A third place match was included and played between the two losing teams of the semi-finals.

In the knockout stage (including the final), if a match was level at the end of 90 minutes, extra time of two periods (15 minutes each) would be played. If the score was still level after extra time, the match would be decided by a penalty shoot-out. Additionally, a golden goal rule was used, according to which if the goal is scored during the extra time, the game ends immediately and the scoring team becomes the winner.

All times CST (UTC−6).

Qualified teams

Bracket

Semi-finals

Mexico vs United States

Brazil vs Saudi Arabia

Third place play-off

Final

References

Knockout
1999–2000 in Mexican football
Brazil at the 1999 FIFA Confederations Cup
1999 in American soccer
1999–2000 in Saudi Arabian football
August 1999 sports events in North America
August 1999 events in Mexico
Mexico–United States soccer rivalry